The Waipakihi River is a river of the Waikato Region of New Zealand's North Island.

See also
List of rivers of New Zealand

References

Taupō District
Rivers of Waikato
Rivers of New Zealand
Tributaries of the Waikato River